Lisa Brokop is the self-titled third studio album by Canadian country music artist Lisa Brokop. It was released on February 20, 1996 by Capitol Nashville. "She Can't Save Him," "Before He Kissed Me" and "West of Crazy" were all released as singles. Reba McEntire and Trisha Yearwood covered "She Can't Save Him" on McEntire's 2007 album Reba: Duets.

Tracks 1, 3, 7, 8, and 10 were produced by Jerry Crutchfield, while tracks 2, 4, 5, 6, and 9 were produced by Josh Leo.

Track listing
"Language of Love" (Bobby Carmichael, Kostas) - 3:16
"Before He Kissed Me" (Liz Hengber, Mark Irwin) - 2:21
"She Can't Save Him" (Hengber, Bob Regan) - 3:01
"I Know a Heartache When I See One" (Charlie Black, Rory Michael Bourke, Kerry Chater) - 3:45
"Now That We're Not a Family" (Phil Dillon) - 4:25
"West of Crazy" (Gary Burr, Vince Melamed) - 3:32
"I Know Too Much" (Suzi Ragsdale, Verlon Thompson) - 3:28
"At the End of the Day" (Billy Kirsch, Steve Wariner) - 3:35
"That Summer" (Phil Barnhart, Sam Hogin, Sunny Russ) - 3:14
"From the Heart" (Lisa Brokop, Tom McKillip) - 3:13

Personnel

Tracks 1, 3, 7, 8, 10

 Eddie Bayers – drums
 Stephanie Bentley – background vocals
 Lisa Brokop – lead vocals, background vocals
 Gary Burr – background vocals
 Mark Casstevens – acoustic guitar
 Martin Crutchfield – acoustic guitar, electric guitar
 Paul Franklin – steel guitar
 Sonny Garrish – steel guitar
 Sarah Hooker – background vocals
 Dann Huff – electric guitar
 David Hungate – bass guitar
 Steve Gibson – acoustic guitar
 Jim Horn – saxophone
 Mitch Humphrey – keyboards
 Carl Marsh – keyboards
 Steve Nathan – piano
 Brent Rowan – electric guitar
 Steve Wariner – electric guitar, background vocals
 Willie Weeks – bass guitar
 Reggie Young – electric guitar

Keyboard and string arrangements on "At the End of the Day" by Carl Marsh.

Tracks 2, 4, 5, 6, 9

 Lisa Brokop – lead vocals
 Dan Dugmore – steel guitar
 Kenny Edwards – background vocals
 Andrew Gold – background vocals
 Dann Huff – electric guitar
 David Hungate – bass guitar
 Paul Mascioli – percussion on "Now That We're Not a Family"
 Steve Nathan – keyboards
 Dawn Sears – background vocals
 Harry Stinson – background vocals
 Wendy Waldman – background vocals
 Biff Watson – acoustic guitar
 Lonnie Wilson – drums

Chart performance

External links
[ Lisa Brokop] at Allmusic

1996 albums
Capitol Records albums
Lisa Brokop albums